The Israel women's national ice hockey team is the women's national ice hockey team of Israel.

History
The team first played in an international tournament at the 2022 IIHF Women's World Championship Division III.

World Championship record
2022 – Finished in 38th place (2nd in Division IIIB)

References

External links
IIHF profile
National Teams of Ice Hockey

Ice hockey
Women's national ice hockey teams in Europe